The Nail: The Story of Joey Nardone is a 2009 drama film. The film was directed by James Quattrochi and stars Tony Luke Jr., Tony Danza, and William Forsythe.

Plot
After eight years in prison for manslaughter, former professional boxer Joey Nardone (Tony Luke, Jr.) is trying to get his life back on track.

References

External links
 
 
 

2009 films
American drama films
2000s English-language films
2009 drama films
Films shot in Pennsylvania
2000s American films